G500 may refer to:
Gulfstream G500, a Gulfstream Aerospace business jet
Logitech G500, a corded laser mouse
Mercedes-Benz G500, a four-wheel drive sport utility vehicle
Toshiba G500 smartphone
 Fortune Global 500, an annual ranking of the top 500 corporations worldwide as measured by revenue